Transient receptor potential cation channel, subfamily C, member 7, also known as TRPC7, is a human gene encoding a protein of the same name.

See also
 TRPC

Further reading

External links 
 

Ion channels